Ronnie Rodney Bull (born 26 December 1980) is an English former professional footballer who played as a left full back and left-sided or central midfielder from 1999 to 2013.

He played in the Football League for Millwall, Yeovil Town, Brentford, Grimsby Town and Exeter City as well as playing in the Australian A-League for the New Zealand Knights. He has since returned to England and has forged a career playing non-League football, having appeared for Basingstoke Town, Rushden & Diamonds, Grays Athletic, Crawley Town, Ebbsfleet United, Fisher Athletic and Salisbury City.

Playing career

Millwall
Bull started his career with Millwall, playing in the same youth side as Tim Cahill and Lucas Neill. He made 50 appearances before his release in April 2004. By this point, he had completed loan spells with Yeovil Town and Brentford and joined the latter club on a permanent deal for the final month of the 2003–04 season.

Grimsby
In 2004, he left Brentford to join Grimsby Town. Bull stayed for a season before he was offered a move abroad.

New Zealand Knights
He then moved to New Zealand to play for the New Zealand Knights in the newly formed A-League. He made many appearances for them before leaving the side.

Return to England
Bull left the club in November 2005 to return to the UK, less than halfway through the Knights' disastrous first season. In 2006, he returned to Millwall to train, attempting to increase his fitness after injury.

On his return to England, he signed with Rushden & Diamonds. He left Rushden in November 2006 to join Grays Athletic. He then signed for Crawley Town during the January 2007 transfer window, and scored on his debut against Aldershot Town.

Bull left Crawley in January 2008 after he was told he was surplus to requirements. He subsequently signed for Ebbsfleet United, but he was released at the end of the 2007–08 season.

He went on trial with Salisbury in the summer of 2008 before he joined Fisher Athletic in October 2008. He made just a handful of appearances before joining Exeter City. It was announced in January 2009 that he was to stay with the League Two side until the end of the 2008–09 season.

At the start of the 2009–10 season, Bull rejoined for Grays Athletic along with eight other players. This was after he had been in talks with Salisbury City, but a move failed to materialise because of the club's financial position.

Salisbury City
On 2 February 2010, Bull signed for Salisbury City on a contract that kept him at the club until the end of the 2009–10 season. Then after this he signed a new contract keeping him at Salisbury for another year.

Eastbourne Borough
Bull signed for Eastbourne Borough on 17 February 2012. Bull left Eastbourne at the end of the season without having made a first team appearance.

References

External links

 Player Profile, Ebbsfleet United Website
 Ronnie Bull Basingstoke Town Profile

1980 births
Living people
Footballers from Hackney Central
English footballers
Millwall F.C. players
Yeovil Town F.C. players
Brentford F.C. players
Grimsby Town F.C. players
New Zealand Knights FC players
Basingstoke Town F.C. players
Rushden & Diamonds F.C. players
Grays Athletic F.C. players
Crawley Town F.C. players
Ebbsfleet United F.C. players
Fisher Athletic F.C. players
Exeter City F.C. players
Salisbury City F.C. players
Eastbourne Borough F.C. players
Hayes & Yeading United F.C. players
English Football League players
A-League Men players
National League (English football) players
Expatriate association footballers in New Zealand
English expatriate footballers
Association football fullbacks